Henry Bovell (born 15 March 1936) is an Australian cricketer. He played one first-class match for Western Australia in 1961/62.

See also
 List of Western Australia first-class cricketers

References

External links
 

1936 births
Living people
Australian cricketers
Western Australia cricketers
Cricketers from Fremantle